Cum saepe accidere was a papal bull issued by Pope Clement VIII on 28 February 1592, which decreed that the Jews of Avignon were forbidden to trade "new commodities" in public places in order to put them at an economic disadvantage.

See also
Christian anti-Judaism
History of trade
List of papal bulls

References

Documents of Pope Clement XIII
16th-century papal bulls
Early Modern Christian anti-Judaism
1592 in Christianity
1592 documents